The Bollinger-Hartley House is a historic house located at 423 North Main Street in Blowing Rock, Watauga County, North Carolina.

Description and history 
It was built in 1914, and is a -story, Bungalow/American Craftsman style frame dwelling. It rests on a stone foundation and has a full-width front porch and stone chimney. The house features native stone and chestnut, weatherboards, and wood shingles. Also on the property is a contributing stone cellar (c. 1933) and spring house / shop (c. 1920).

It was listed on the National Register of Historic Places on March 9, 1995.

References

Houses on the National Register of Historic Places in North Carolina
Houses completed in 1914
Houses in Watauga County, North Carolina
National Register of Historic Places in Watauga County, North Carolina
Bungalow architecture in North Carolina
American Craftsman architecture in North Carolina